"Badge" is a song written by Eric Clapton and George Harrison, and recorded by British rock music group Cream on their final album, Goodbye. Also issued as a single in March 1969, "Badge" peaked at number 18 in the UK Singles Chart and number 60 on the US Billboard Hot 100 chart.

Composition 
"Badge" was originally an untitled track. During the production transfer for the album Goodbye, the original music sheet was used to produce the liner notes and track listing. The only discernible word on the page was "bridge" (indicating the song's bridge section). Due to Harrison's handwriting, however, Clapton misread it as "badge"—and the song was titled soon thereafter.

Harrison remembered the story thus:

Common legends or misconceptions are that the name came about because its chord progression was B–A–D–G–E (which is not true) or simply because the notation of a guitar's standard tuning (E–A–D–G–B–E) can be arranged to spell "Badge".

Writing and publishing credits
In the US, Atco Records' initial releases of Goodbye and of "Badge" as a single gave the song's writing credit to Clapton alone, with publishing credit to Robert Stigwood's company Casserole (BMI). Atco later corrected this in 1969 with the release of Best of Cream, which lists both Clapton and Harrison as the song's authors. The UK single of "Badge" released by Polydor Records gave writing credit to both Clapton and Harrison, with publishing credit going to Dratleaf and Harrisongs Ltd. Since the early 1990s the writing credit has been listed as Clapton/Harrison with publishing credit going to E.C. Music, Ltd. and Harrisongs.

Personnel
 Eric Clapton – lead guitar, vocals
 Jack Bruce – bass guitar
 Ginger Baker – drums
 Felix Pappalardi – piano, mellotron
 George Harrison  (credited, for contractual reasons, as "L'Angelo Misterioso") – rhythm guitar

Charts

References

Cream (band) songs
1969 singles
Songs written by George Harrison
Songs written by Eric Clapton
Polydor Records singles
Atco Records singles
1968 songs